The Battle of Gdov in the Russo-Swedish War took place on September 16, 1657 in Gdov. The battle was a clear victory for Prince Ivan Khovansky of the Tsardom of Russia over Swedish Governor-General Count Magnus De la Gardie allowing the Russians to regroup after a brief resurgence of Swedish resistance.

Prelude 
After the defeat at Walk, in July 1657, Ivan Khovansky was appointed as the Pskov voivode. His army was reinforced with 10 companies of Reiters and 3 companies of Dragoons (about 1,200 men).  In September, the Swedes under Governor-General Count Magnus De la Gardie invaded the Gdov district, but Prince Khovansky timely learned about the invasion of the Swedish army and managed to reinforce the garrison of the city to 1,000 men (300 noble militia, 300 Don Cossacks, 200 Streltsy, 100 Luga Cossacks, 100 mercenaries), but with only two guns. Nevertheless, the garrison managed to repel all attacks, and even make several successful sorties.

Battle 
Upon learning of the arrival of the Swedes, Prince Khovansky hastily advanced to Gdov. On the night of September 16, Russian troops caught the retreating army of Delagardi 3 versts from Gdov on the river Chermi. Beginning the persecution, Prince Khovansky sent forward the cavalry: 12 noble hundreds, Don Cossacks and Reiters. The decisive action was the attack of the Russian Reiters, who knocked the enemy out of position and fled. De la Gardie ordered all his artillery to be thrown into the water. In 15 versts of persecution, Russian troops scattered enemy forces. Swedes lost many officers, banners, artillery and over 1.000 men.

Aftermath 
Having broken the troops of the Governor-General Count De la Gardie, the victory of Prince Khovansky greatly diminished the recent successes of the Swedish army in 1657, and restored the strategic initiative of the Russian army.

References 

Second Northern War
Gdov(1657)
Gdov(1657)
Conflicts in 1657
1657 in Europe